Jack of all trades may refer to:
Jack of all trades, master of none, an aphorism
"Jack of All Trades", a term to reference one with the ability to be proficient in many areas of life

Film and television
Jack of All Trades (TV series), an American syndicated comedy/action program
Jack of All Trades (1936 film), a 1936 British film starring Jack Hulbert
Jack of All Trades (2012 film), a 2012 Chinese film starring Wang Baoqiang and Eric Tsang
"Jacks of All Trades", an  episode of the American television series Black-ish
Jack of All Trades, a 2018 documentary on sportscards directed by Stuart Stone

Music
Jack of All Trades (album), a 2007 album by Wildchild
Jack of All Trades, a 2006 album by The Jacka
"Jack of All Trades", a song by Bruce Springsteen from the album Wrecking Ball
"Jack of All Trades", a song by Soul Asylum from Hang Time
"Jack of All Trades", a song by Beach House from their self-titled album
"Jack of All Trades", a song by The Andrews Sisters on 78 RPM : Decca 4097 B, December 1941

Other uses
"Jacks of All Trades", a secret society in The Graveyard Book
"Jack of All Trades", a term to reference one with the ability to be proficient in many areas of life

See also 
 Polytehnitis kai erimospitis, 1963 comedy film by Alekos Sakellarios